Charles William Johnson was a Canadian politician from the province of Saskatchewan.

Political career 
Johnson was elected in Willow Bunch at the 1929 Saskatchewan general election as a Liberal. He was re-elected in 1934.

When his constituency was abolished in 1938, he sat for Notukeu-Willow Bunch until 1944

Electoral record 

|-

 
|Conservative
|William James Gibbins
|align="right"|4,316
|align="right"|49.39%
|align="right"|-
|- bgcolor="white"
!align="left" colspan=3|Total
!align="right"|8,739
!align="right"|100.00%
!align="right"|

|-

 
|Conservative
|Edgar B. Linnell
|align="right"|1,445
|align="right"|28.27%
|align="right"|-21.12

|Farmer-Labour
|Charles Morley W. Emery
|align="right"|1,219
|align="right"|23.85%
|align="right"|–
|- bgcolor="white"
!align="left" colspan=3|Total
!align="right"|5,112
!align="right"|100.00%
!align="right"|

|-

 
|CCF
|John E. Lidgett
|align="right"|2,859
|align="right"|37.53%
|align="right"|–

|- bgcolor="white"
!align="left" colspan=3|Total
!align="right"|7,618
!align="right"|100.00%
!align="right"|

References 

 Membership of Legislatures

External links 
 Saskatchewan Archives Board – Saskatchewan Election Results By Electoral Division

Saskatchewan Liberal Party MLAs
20th-century Canadian politicians
Year of birth missing
Year of death missing